Brandsnutene or Brandsnutane is a  tall mountain on the border of Agder and Vestfold og Telemark counties in southern Norway. It is the second highest mountain in Agder of the mountains with a prominence of at least . The mountain is located on the border of the municipalities of Bykle (in Agder) and Tokke (in Vestfold og Telemark).

The mountain sits in the Setesdalsheiene mountains on the east side of the Setesdal valley. It is part of a line of large mountains marking the county border. The mountain Gråsteinsnosi lies a few kilometers to the north and the mountains of Svolhusgreini and Sæbyggjenuten lie a few kilometers to the south. The lake Byrtevatn in Tokke lies  straight to the east.

See also
List of mountains in Norway by height

References

Mountains of Agder
Mountains of Vestfold og Telemark
Bykle
Tokke